Derek Brown may refer to:

Derek Brown (editor) (born ), British editor of the Michelin Red Guides 
Derek Brown (handballer) (born 1970), American handball player
Derek Brown (mixologist) (born 1974), American writer and mixologist
Derek Brown (musician) (born 1983), American jazz saxophonist
Derek Brown (politician) (born 1971), American politician in Utah
Derek Brown (running back) (born 1971), American football running back for the New Orleans Saints
Derek Brown (tight end) (born 1970), American football tight end for the New York Giants, Jacksonville Jaguars, Oakland Raiders, and Arizona Cardinals
Derek Brown (rugby union) (1932–2013), Scottish rugby union player

See also
Jason Derek Brown (born 1969), American fugitive and accused murderer
Derrick Brown (disambiguation)